Max Seydewitz (December 19, 1892 – February 8, 1987) was a German politician (SPD, SAPD and SED).   Between 1947 and 1952 he was the Minister-President of Saxony in the German Democratic Republic.

Life
Max Seydewitz was born in a small town some 25 km (15 miles) east of Cottbus and 150 km (90 miles) south-east of Berlin.    His father was a tanner. He attended school locally and undertook an apprenticeship as a book printer. He joined a socialist youth movement in 1907 and in 1910 became a member of the SPD. He served as a soldier in the war between 1914 and 1915 when he was released from the army on grounds of "unsuitability" for war. From 1918 till 1920 he worked as contributing editor on the "Volksblatt" ("People's Voice"), a socialist newspaper in Halle before moving to Zwickau where from 1920 till 1931 he served as Editor in Chief with "Saxony Volksblatt", a daily newspaper of the political left.

In 1931 the left-wing of the SPD was expelled and Seydewitz alongside members such as Kurt Rosenfeld established Socialist Workers' Party of Germany, which he became the co-chair.

After the Nazi seizure of power, Seydewitz fled Germany and eventually settled in Stockholm and worked as a journalist. During his exile he established contact with the Communist Party of Germany. For a period he was a resident in the Soviet Union and during the Great Purge he was suppressed although he was later relieved of all charges. His two sons however were sent to gulags and weren't released until after the Second World War.

In 1945 he arrived at Berlin and in 1946 he became a member of the Socialist Unity Party of Germany and was for a brief period editor of the theoretical organ of SED, Einheit. From 1946 to 1947 he was director of the Berliner Rundfunk.

Seydewitz was elected by the Saxon state parliament as Prime Minister of Saxony and became a member of the Volkskammer. In 1951 was attacked as part of an internal party campaign against former SAPD members and had to practice “self-criticism”. With the dissolution of the federal states in 1952, he lost his position as Prime Minister of Saxony, but remained a member of the Volkskammer until his death in 1987.

From 1955 to 1968 Seydewitz was director of Staatliche Kunstsammlungen Dresden.

Seydewitz died in 1987 in Dresden.

Statistical comparisons
Born in Forst (Lausitz), Seydewitz was the oldest former Minister-President of Germany from November 26, 1985 to May 5, 1991 preceded by Hans Ehard and succeeded by Bruno Diekmann. If one only counts the Ministers-President of the GDR he was oldest from August 1981 to October 8, 1991; preceded by Karl Steinhoff and succeeded by Werner Bruschke.

Publications 
 Die Krise des Kapitalismus und die Aufgabe der Arbeiterklasse. Verlag der Marxistischen Büchergemeinde, Berlin 1931
 Todesstrahlen und andere neue Kriegswaffen, mit Kurt Doberer. Malik-Verlag, London 1936
 Stalin oder Trotzki? Die UdSSR und der Trotzkismus. Eine zeitgeschichtliche Untersuchung. Malik-Verlag, London 1938.
 Hakenkreuz über Europa? Vannier, Paris 1939
 Civil Life in Wartime Germany. The Story of the Home Front. New York 1945.
 Es geht um Deutschland. Sachsen-Verlag, Dresden 1949. (gesammelte Rundfunkkommentare 1946–1947).
 Der Antisemitismus in der Bundesrepublik. Mit Ruth Seydewitz, Hrsg. Ausschuß für deutsche Einheit, Berlin 1956
 Das Dresdener Galerie Buch: 400 Jahre Dresdener Gemäldegalerie , mit Ruth Seydewitz, Verlag der Kunst, Dresden 1957
 Deutschland zwischen Oder und Rhein: Ein Beitr. zur neuesten dt. Geschichte. Kongress-Verlag, Berlin 1958
 Zerstörung und Wiederaufbau von Dresden Berlin (Ost) 1955. (ab 3. Auflage: Die unbesiegbare Stadt)
 Die Dresdener Kunstschätze: Zur Geschichte d. Grünen Gewölbes u.d. anderen Dresdener Kunstsammlungen, mit Ruth Seydewitz, VEB Verlag der Kunst, Dresden 1960
 Ruth und Max Seydewitz, Die Dame mit dem Hermelin: Der grösste Kunstraub aller Zeiten. Henschelverlag, Berlin (Ost) 1963
 Es hat sich gelohnt zu leben. Lebenserinnerungen eines alten Arbeiterfunktionärs. Dietz Verlag, Berlin (Ost) 1976.
 Dresden, Musen und Menschen. Ein Beitrag zur Geschichte der Stadt, ihrer Kunst und Kultur. Buchverlag Der Morgen, Berlin, 1988

External links

References

1892 births
1987 deaths
People from Forst (Lausitz)
People from the Province of Brandenburg
Social Democratic Party of Germany politicians
Socialist Workers' Party of Germany politicians
Socialist Unity Party of Germany politicians
Members of the Reichstag of the Weimar Republic
Members of the Provisional Volkskammer
Members of the 1st Volkskammer
Members of the 2nd Volkskammer
Members of the 3rd Volkskammer
Members of the 4th Volkskammer
Members of the 5th Volkskammer
Members of the 6th Volkskammer
Members of the 7th Volkskammer
Members of the 8th Volkskammer
Members of the 9th Volkskammer
Ministers-President of Saxony
Exiles from Nazi Germany
Refugees in Norway
Refugees in Sweden
German expatriates in Norway
German expatriates in Sweden
Recipients of the National Prize of East Germany
Recipients of the Patriotic Order of Merit (honor clasp)
Einheit editors
Directors of museums in Germany
Refugees from Nazi Germany in the Soviet Union